The Communauté de communes du Pays du Coquelicot  is a communauté de communes in the Somme département and in the Hauts-de-France région of France. Its population is 28,302 (2018).

Composition
The communauté de communes consists of the following 65 communes:

 Acheux-en-Amiénois
 Albert
 Arquèves
 Auchonvillers
 Authie
 Authuille
 Aveluy
 Bayencourt
 Bazentin
 Beaucourt-sur-l'Ancre
 Beaumont-Hamel
 Bécordel-Bécourt
 Bertrancourt
 Bouzincourt
 Bray-sur-Somme
 Buire-sur-l'Ancre
 Bus-lès-Artois
 Cappy
 Carnoy-Mametz
 Chuignolles
 Coigneux
 Colincamps
 Contalmaison
 Courcelette
 Courcelles-au-Bois
 Curlu
 Dernancourt
 Éclusier-Vaux
 Englebelmer
 Étinehem-Méricourt
 Forceville
 Fricourt
 Frise
 Grandcourt
 Harponville
 Hédauville
 Hérissart
 Irles
 Laviéville
 Léalvillers
 Louvencourt
 Mailly-Maillet
 Maricourt
 Marieux
 Méaulte
 Mesnil-Martinsart
 Millencourt
 Miraumont
 Montauban-de-Picardie
 Morlancourt
 La Neuville-lès-Bray
 Ovillers-la-Boisselle
 Pozières
 Puchevillers
 Pys
 Raincheval
 Saint-Léger-lès-Authie
 Senlis-le-Sec
 Suzanne
 Thiepval
 Thièvres
 Toutencourt
 Varennes, Somme
 Vauchelles-lès-Authie
 Ville-sur-Ancre

Responsibilities  
The communes of the communauté delegate their representatives with the following responsibilities: 
 Establishment of a joint development zone
 Help for the communes in the development of their town planning documents.
 Economic and land use planning
 Studies, programming, land acquisition and creation of the air industry in Haute Picardie and an economic area near Méaulte.
 Acquisition of land, planning and management of areas of community interest of more than 1 hectare.
 Studies on water quality.
 Studies on flood control
 Collection, treatment and recovery of household waste.
 Studies and action from residents for the schedule for improving housing.
 Information from landlords and tenants for local housing
 Creation or alteration and maintenance of roads in the public domain known as "intercommunal" defined on the basis of criteria including: School routes, business roads and tourist paths.
 Removal of snow on the roads
 Financing of the local mission
 Workshops during the school holidays.
 Leisure centre with or without accommodation centres for the young
 Music Schools
 Library
 Creation of a community newspaper
 Transportation
 Fishing Schools
 Promoting tourism and hospitality.
 Maintenance of hiking routes defined by the Department

Budget and Taxation 
The Community is funded by: 
 Single business tax (at a rate of 10.29% in 2006), which replaces the taxes previously collected by the communes.
 A refuse collection tax.

Economic Development 
 'Platform aero-industrial''' to be carried out as a joint project with the Department of the Somme. The project costs of €40 million is to be funded by the European Union (22.5%), the region Picardie (30%), the département (30%), Airbus (11.25%) and the communauté (6.25%). As such, the communauté will pay €468,000 in 2008.
 The business park at Albert.
 The draft joint development zone'' located between Méaulte and Bécordel-Bécourt between Airbus and the airport at Albert.

Wind power development 
The Community Council of 12 November 2007 approved a draft covering 19 communes, mainly in the north of the territory, which could accommodate wind turbines, if the Prefect approves the application.

See also 
Communes of the Somme department

References

Pays du Coquelicot
Pays du Coquelicot